League tables for teams participating in Ykkönen, the second tier of the Finnish Soccer League system, in 2003.

League table

HIFK Helsinki withdrew from the Ykkönen and their place was inherited by Korsholm Mustasaari, the highest placed relegated team in 2002.

Promotion play-offs
KooTeePee Kotka as 13th placed team in the 2003 Veikkausliiga and RoPS as runners-up of the 2003 Ykkönen competed in a two-legged play-off for a place in the Veikkausliiga. RoPS won the play-offs 6-4 on aggregate and were promoted to the Veikkausliiga.

RoPS Rovaniemi - KooTeePee Kotka  4-1
KooTeePee Kotka - RoPS Rovaniemi  3-2

Relegation play-offs
GBK Kokkola - P-Iirot Rauma       1-1
P-Iirot Rauma - GBK Kokkola       3-0

PS Kemi - FC Kuusankoski          2-3
FC Kuusankoski - PS Kemi          2-0

P-Iirot Rauma were promoted to the Ykkönen and GBK Kokkola relegated to the Kakkonen. P-Iirot Rauma won 4-1 on aggregate.
FC Kuusankoski remained in the Ykkönen after beating PS Kemi 5-2 on aggregate.

References

Ykkönen seasons
2003 in Finnish football
Fin
Fin